Dalla frater, the frater skipperling, is a species of butterfly in the family Hesperiidae. It is found from Panama to Bolivia. Wingspan: 25–28 mm.

References

Butterflies described in 1878
frater
Hesperiidae of South America
Lepidoptera of Colombia
Butterflies of Central America
Taxa named by Paul Mabille